Malo language may refer to:
Tamambo language (Vanuatu)
Melo language (Ethiopia)
Malo dialect of the Santa Cruz language (Solomon Islands)

See also 
 Maloh language (Borneo, Indonesia)